The 2011 Malaysia Super Series was the first tournament of the 2011 BWF Super Series in badminton. It was held in Kuala Lumpur, Malaysia from 18 to 23 January 2011.

Men's singles

Seeds

  Lee Chong Wei (Champion)
  Taufik Hidayat
  Chen Long
  Chen Jin
  Lin Dan
  Boonsak Ponsana
  Bao Chunlai
  Nguyen Tien Minh

Top half

Bottom half

Finals

Women's singles

Seeds

  Wang Xin
  Wang Shixian
  Wang Yihan
  Jiang Yanjiao
  Juliane Schenk
  Bae Youn-joo
  Yip Pui Yin
  Li Xuerui

Top half

Bottom half
{{16TeamBracket-Compact-Tennis3
| RD1=First Round
| RD2=Second Round
| RD3=Quarterfinals
| RD4=Semifinals
| RD1-seed01=
| RD1-team01= J Cicognini
| RD1-score01-1=11
| RD1-score01-2=15
| RD1-score01-3=
| RD1-seed02=
| RD1-team02= A Goto
| RD1-score02-1=21
| RD1-score02-2=21
| RD1-score02-3=
| RD1-seed03=
| RD1-team03= Liu X
| RD1-score03-1=21
| RD1-score03-2=20
| RD1-score03-3=21
| RD1-seed04=6
| RD1-team04= Bae Y-j
| RD1-score04-1=15
| RD1-score04-2=22
| RD1-score04-3=10
| RD1-seed05=Q2
| RD1-team05= A Kurihara
| RD1-score05-1=21
| RD1-score05-2=11
| RD1-score05-3=13
| RD1-seed06=PFQ
| RD1-team06= Fu MT
| RD1-score06-1=10
| RD1-score06-2=21
| RD1-score06-3=21
| RD1-seed07=
| RD1-team07= P Nedelcheva
| RD1-score07-1=13
| RD1-score07-2=9
| RD1-score07-3=
| RD1-seed08=4
| RD1-team08= Jiang YJ
| RD1-score08-1=21
| RD1-score08-2=21
| RD1-score08-3=
| RD1-seed09=
| RD1-team09= Yao J
| RD1-score09-1=19
| RD1-score09-2=12
| RD1-score09-3=
| RD1-seed10=
| RD1-team10= Cheng S-c
| RD1-score10-1=21
| RD1-score10-2=21
| RD1-score10-3=
| RD1-seed11=
| RD1-team11= Gu J
| RD1-score11-1=12
| RD1-score11-2=19
| RD1-score11-3=
| RD1-seed12=8
| RD1-team12= Li XR
| RD1-score12-1=21
| RD1-score12-2=21| RD1-score12-3=
| RD1-seed13=Q1
| RD1-team13= Cheah L L Y
| RD1-score13-1=21| RD1-score13-2=19
| RD1-score13-3=24
| RD1-seed14=
| RD1-team14= Tai T-y| RD1-score14-1=17
| RD1-score14-2=21| RD1-score14-3=26| RD1-seed15=
| RD1-team15= S Ponsana
| RD1-score15-1=17
| RD1-score15-2=8
| RD1-score15-3=
| RD1-seed16=2
| RD1-team16= Wang SX| RD1-score16-1=21| RD1-score16-2=21| RD1-score16-3=
| RD2-seed01=
| RD2-team01= A Goto
| RD2-score01-1=12
| RD2-score01-2=11
| RD2-score01-3=
| RD2-seed02=
| RD2-team02= Liu X| RD2-score02-1=21| RD2-score02-2=21| RD2-score02-3=
| RD2-seed03=PFQ
| RD2-team03= Fu MT
| RD2-score03-1=12
| RD2-score03-2=21| RD2-score03-3=10
| RD2-seed04=4
| RD2-team04= Jiang YJ| RD2-score04-1=21| RD2-score04-2=17
| RD2-score04-3=21| RD2-seed05=
| RD2-team05= Cheng S-c| RD2-score05-1=21| RD2-score05-2=15
| RD2-score05-3=21| RD2-seed06=8
| RD2-team06= Li XR
| RD2-score06-1=14
| RD2-score06-2=21| RD2-score06-3=11
| RD2-seed07=
| RD2-team07= Tai T-y
| RD2-score07-1=17
| RD2-score07-2=17
| RD2-score07-3=
| RD2-seed08=2
| RD2-team08= Wang SX| RD2-score08-1=21| RD2-score08-2=21| RD2-score08-3=
| RD3-seed01=
| RD3-team01= Liu X
| RD3-score01-1=
| RD3-score01-2=
| RD3-score01-3=
| RD3-seed02=4
| RD3-team02= Jiang YJ| RD3-score02-1=w/o
| RD3-score02-2=
| RD3-score02-3=
| RD3-seed03=
| RD3-team03= Cheng S-c
| RD3-score03-1=21| RD3-score03-2=17
| RD3-score03-3=9
| RD3-seed04=2
| RD3-team04= Wang SX| RD3-score04-1=19
| RD3-score04-2=21| RD3-score04-3=21| RD4-seed01=4
| RD4-team01= Jiang YJ
| RD4-score01-1=19
| RD4-score01-2=17
| RD4-score01-3=
| RD4-seed02=2
| RD4-team02= Wang SX| RD4-score02-1=21| RD4-score02-2=21'''
| RD4-score02-3=
}}

Finals

Men's doubles

Seeds

  Koo Kien Keat / Tan Boon Heong
  Ko Sung-hyun / Yoo Yeon-seong
  Alvent Yulianto Chandra / Hendra Aprida Gunawan
  Hirokatsu Hashimoto / Noriyasu Hirata
  Chai Biao / Guo Zhendong
  Muhammad Ahsan / Bona Septano
  Howard Bach / Tony Gunawan
  Chen Hung-ling / Lin Yu-lang

Top half

Bottom half

Finals

Women's doubles

Seeds

  Cheng Wen-hsing / Chien Yu-chin
 / Petya Nedelcheva / Anastasia Russkikh
  Duanganong Aroonkesorn / Kunchala Voravichitchaikul
  Meiliana Jauhari / Greysia Polii
  Du Jing / Pan Pan
  Wang Xiaoli / Yu Yang
  Cheng Shu / Ma Jin
  Tian Qing / Zhao Yunlei

Top half

Bottom half

Finals

Mixed doubles

Seeds

  Sudket Prapakamol / Saralee Thungthongkam
  Ko Sung-hyun / Ha Jung-eun
  Zhang Nan / Zhao Yunlei
  Chen Hung-ling / Cheng Wen-hsing
  Tao Jiaming / Tian Qing
  Joachim Fischer Nielsen / Christinna Pedersen
  He Hanbin / Ma Jin
  Tantowi Ahmad / Lilyana Natsir

Top half

Bottom half

Finals

References

External links
Malaysia Super Series 2011 at tournamentsoftware.com''

2011 Malaysia Super Series
2011 in Malaysian sport
2011 Malaysia Super Series
2011 BWF Super Series